Siumut is a political party in Greenland in the social democratic tradition.  Since the establishment of home rule in 1979, it has been the dominant party in Greenland. Siumut is led by Erik Jensen, who beat the then-incumbent Prime Minister Kim Kielsen in a tight leadership contest in late 2020.

Party members have been elected to both the parliament of Greenland and the parliament of Denmark.

Siumut was formed in 1971 as a political movement, and became a party in 1977. Following the establishment of home rule for Greenland in January 1979, the party won 13 of 21 seats in the 1979 Greenlandic general election for the newly formed Parliament of Greenland, and party chairman Jonathan Motzfeldt became the first Prime Minister of Greenland.

History
Following the 1991 Greenlandic general election, Motzfeldt stepped down and was replaced by Lars Emil Johansen, also of Siumut, who governed in coalition with Inuit Ataqatigiit.

From 1997, and until 2002, Motzfeldt was again Prime Minister, until he was succeeded by Hans Enoksen. From 1979 until 2009 and since 2013, members of Siumut have served as Greenland's Prime Minister.  In the 15 November 2005 general election, the party won 30.7% of the popular vote and 10 out of 31 seats in the parliament. In the 2009 general election, it won 26.5% of the popular vote and 9 seats and in the 2013 election, it won 42.8% of the popular vote and 14 out of 31 seats. At the 2014 election the party was still the largest party, but it lost three members of the parliament and has now 11 members. Siumut further declined to 9 seats in the 2018 Greenlandic general election.

Positions
The party was an observer affiliate of the Socialist International.

Siumut representatives sitting in the Danish parliament have been attached to the parliamentary group of the Social Democrats.

Election results

Parliament of Greenland (Inatsisartut)

Parliament of the Kingdom of Denmark (Folketinget)

Symbols and logos

External links
Official website
Greenlandic Parliament official website
The North Atlantic Group in the Danish Parliament

Notes

References

Political parties in Greenland
Social democratic parties
Socialist parties in Greenland
Greenlandic nationalism
Former member parties of the Socialist International